David Veale (born 25 April 1950) is a Canadian bobsledder. He competed in the four man event at the 1976 Winter Olympics.

References

External links
 

1950 births
Living people
Canadian male bobsledders
Olympic bobsledders of Canada
Bobsledders at the 1976 Winter Olympics
Sportspeople from Waterloo, Ontario